Predrag Filipović may refer to:
 Predrag Filipović (racewalker) (born 1978), Serbian racewalker
 Predrag Filipović (footballer) (born 1975), Montenegrin footballer